NGC 6738 is an astronomical feature that is catalogued as an NGC object. Although listed as an open cluster in some astronomical databases, it may be merely an asterism; a 2003 paper in the journal Astronomy and Astrophysics describes it as being an "apparent concentration of a few bright stars on patchy background absorption".

References

External links
 Simbad
 Image NGC 6738
 NGC 6738

6738
Aquila (constellation)
Open clusters
Asterisms (astronomy)